The 45th district of the Texas House of Representatives contains most of Hays county. The current Representative is Erin Zwiener, who was first elected in 2018.

References 

45